The Great Christmas Light Fight (originally titled Lights, Camera, Christmas! in development) is an American reality television competition show that premiered on December 9, 2013 on ABC. The series is traditionally scheduled in a double-run of two hour-long episodes, all airing Mondays in the first three weeks of December annually as part of ABC's seasonal programming lineup (now branded since 2017 as 25 Days of Christmas). On November 1, 2019, the series was renewed for an eighth season which premiered on December 9, 2020. On December 10, 2020, the series was renewed for a ninth season which premiered on November 28, 2021.

On October 28, 2021, the series was renewed for a tenth season which premiered on November 28, 2022.

On October 24, 2022, the series was renewed for an eleventh season.

Synopsis
Each episode of The Great Christmas Light Fight features a series of families or groups that create elaborate Christmas light displays. The contestants are chosen in advance by producers. The displays are judged on three categories: use of lights, overall design, and Christmas spirit. Each display is first individually featured, then the judge or judges review the display and its specific details. Once all contestants have been reviewed, a winner is chosen, and the judges return to the winner to congratulate them. The winner of each week's episode wins $50,000 and a holiday-themed trophy.

The series had a Halloween-themed special episode entitled The Great Halloween Fright Fight which aired October 28, 2014. The judging criteria for this episode was similar to the regular Christmas episodes, with three factors: overall design, Halloween spirit, and creativity.

Episodes

Series overview

Season 1 (2013)

Special (2014)

Season 2 (2014)

Season 3 (2015)

Season 4 (2016)

Season 5 (2017)

Season 6 (2018)

Season 7 (2019)

Season 8 (2020)

Season 9 (2021)

Season 10 (2022)

References

External links
Official Website
The Great Christmas Light Fight: Season 1 on YouTube from ABCOnDemand
The Great Christmas Light Fight: Season 2 on YouTube from ABCOnDemand
The Great Halloween Fright Fight on YouTube from ABCOnDemand
Watch The Great Christmas Light Fight TV Show - ABC.com

2010s American reality television series
2013 American television series debuts
2020s American reality television series
American Broadcasting Company original programming
Christmas television specials
English-language television shows
Television series by Fremantle (company)